Léon Glovacki (19 February 1928 – 9 September 2009) was a French football striker.

Personal life
Glovacki was born in France, and was of Polish descent. He was an international for the France national football team.

References

 Profile

1928 births
2009 deaths
French footballers
France international footballers
French people of Polish descent
Association football forwards
Ligue 1 players
ES Troyes AC players
Stade de Reims players
AS Monaco FC players
AS Saint-Étienne players
1954 FIFA World Cup players
French football managers
FC Annecy managers
AC Avigonnnais managers
Sportspeople from Pas-de-Calais
Footballers from Hauts-de-France